The Currency of Maldives is Rufiyaa, (introduced in 1947). The rufiyaa is divided into 100 laari.

History

Boli

Cowry shells (Cypraea moneta), or boli, were the first known medium of exchange used in the Maldives. Various writers and travellers have in the past recorded the country's trade in these money shells, which were used as a medium of exchange in parts of Asia and Africa. In the past, cowry were actually cultivated in the Maldives. When Moroccan traveler and historian Ibn Battuta visited therefadsahijsjsac0, feojedfe Dutch in Ceylon, continued until the late 19th century, when it was used mostly as ballast for sailing vessels.

Dhigu laari
According to history, the first dhigu laari was struck in the Maldives, during the reign of Sultan Ibrahim III ibn Ghazi Muhammed (1585-1607), son of the hero Sultan Ghazi Muhammed Thakurufa'anu Akbar al-'Azam. Dhigu laari or larin, which owes its name to Lar, in the Persian Gulf, where it was originally struck, was one of the standard currencies of the Indian Ocean in the late 16th century. The dhigu laari is actually a long piece of silver, about three inches in length, doubled over and stamped with the name of the sultan, in Arabic.

Loa laari
Loa laari or laari fothi ("circular coin") was first struck by Sultan Ibrahim Iskandar I (1648-1687). The first coins were of silver and fairly coarse. Later, coins of copper and lead were put into circulation. Gold coins were also struck by Sultan Hassan Nooraddin (1779-1799). Said to be the finest struck at the Maldive mint, the two denominations of gold coins issued by Sultan Hassan Nooraddin, known as the mohori and bai mohori, were never put into circulation.

Today
The Maldivian unit of currency is the rufiyaa (ISO 4217 code MVR, symbol Rf.), introduced in 1947. The rufiyaa is divided into 100 laari. On 1 February 2009, the exchange rate with the US dollar was US$1.00 = MVR12.80.  On 10 April 2011, the Government announced a limited float of the currency within a band of 20% from the previous exchange rate of 12.80.  Due to short supply of US Dollars, the official rate quoted by all banks as on 10 May stands as follows:  Buy Rate USD 1.00 = MVR 14.42;  Sell Rate USD 1.00 = MVR 15.42.

References
Browder, Tim J.: Maldive Islands Money, Santa Monica, 1969

External links

 Currency in Circulation, Maldives Monetary Authority
Maldives Banknote Collection (1947-2018)
 Exchange rate from Yahoo! Finance.
 Banknotes of the Maldives 

Economy of the Maldives